Kim de l'Horizon (born Dominik Holzer; 9 May 1992) is a Swiss nonbinary novelist, playwright and thespian. In 2022, they won the German Book Prize and the Swiss Book Prize for their debut novel .

Early life and education 

De l'Horizon moved to the canton of Zürich at the age of seven, and attended gymnasium in Winterthur. De l'Horizon started using a pen name, an anagram of their legal first name and last name.

They are pursuing a master's degree in transdisciplinary studies at the Zurich University of the Arts.

Career 

De l'Horizon is an editor of the literary magazine . In 2014, credited as Dominik Holzer, de l'Horizon was a co/author of the Szenart production Industrial Radio in cooperation with Radio Kanal K and the Aargauer Literaturhaus Lenzburg. As a member of the collective E0b0ff, credited as author Dominik Holzer, de l'Horizon wrote the text of, acted in, and developed costumes for the production  ('Plow through the sea of testosterone like a barge'), which the collective staged in 2017. Between 2017 and 2019 de l'Horizon contributed to the Swiss magazine Tsüri.

De l'Horizon was the 2021–2022 resident author at the Bern Theatre. In September 2022, the theater hosted the premiere of de l'Horizon's play Hänsel & Greta & The Big Bad Witch, the first in a planned series of what de l'Horizon classifies as "posthumanist theater" plays.  They are also the author of the 2021 play  ('Then make lemonade, bitch').

De l'Horizon won numerous prizes, including the 2015 Treibhaus and the OpenNet competition at the Solothurn   (Literature Days for Prose), the Textstreich competition for poetry, the  sponsorship award from the Winkelwiese theater and a short film competition from the German daily Hannoversche Allgemeine Zeitung.

De l'Horizon's debut novel, is an autofictional novel about secrets and silences within a family and took de l'Horizon ten years to write.  In the novel, the non-binary narrator resides in Zürich, after having escaped from life in a small conservative village in Switzerland.  Once the narrator's grandmother starts to suffer from dementia, the narrator begins to open up.

The jury for the German Book Prize based their decision on the "urgency and literary innovative power" of de l'Horizon's novel, which they were "provoked and enthusiastic" about. De l'Horizon became the first non-binary person to win the German Book Prize.

During the award ceremony for the German Book Prize, de l'Horizon intoned the song Nightcall by Kavinsky before shaving their head in a sign of solidarity with  women in Iran following the death of Mahsa Amini, and dedicated the prize to them.  De l'Horizon's gesture was met with cheers and a standing ovation from the audience.  Sabine Kieselbach of Deutsche Welle stated that this sort of reception had never happened before in the history of the German Book Prize.  After the ceremony, de l'Horizon was the target of threats and online vitriol.  People gave  one-star reviews on Amazon, and security was provided for de l'Horizon's appearances at the Frankfurt Book Fair.

Personal life 

De l'Horizon lives in Zürich and speaks Bernese German.  They consider themself genderfluid. They regard Kim de l'Horizon as a fictional character ("") who studies witchcraft with the feminist writer Starhawk.

Notes

References

External links

1992 births
Living people
21st-century Swiss dramatists and playwrights
21st-century Swiss novelists
German Book Prize winners
Swiss LGBT dramatists and playwrights
Swiss LGBT novelists
Non-binary novelists
Non-binary dramatists and playwrights
People from Ostermundigen
Swiss Book Prize winners
University of Zurich alumni
Genderfluid people